Richard Diebenkorn (April 22, 1922 – March 30, 1993) was an American painter and printmaker. His early work is associated with abstract expressionism and the Bay Area Figurative Movement of the 1950s and 1960s. In the late 1960s he began his extensive series of geometric, lyrical abstract paintings. Known as the Ocean Park paintings, these paintings were instrumental to his achievement of worldwide acclaim.

Biography
Richard Clifford Diebenkorn Jr. was born on April 22, 1922, in Portland, Oregon. His family moved to San Francisco, California, when he was two years old. From the age of four or five he was continually drawing. In 1940, Diebenkorn entered Stanford University, where he met his first two artistic mentors, professor and muralist Victor Arnautoff, who guided Diebenkorn in classical formal discipline with oil paint, and Daniel Mendelowitz, with whom he shared a passion for the work of Edward Hopper.
Hopper's influence can be seen in Diebenkorn's representational work of this time. While attending Stanford, Diebenkorn visited the home of Sarah Stein, the sister-in-law of Gertrude Stein, and first saw the works of European modernist masters Cézanne, Picasso, and Matisse.

Also at Stanford, Diebenkorn met his fellow student and future wife, Phyllis Antoinette Gilman. They married in 1943 and went on to have two children together, a daughter, Gretchen (1945), and a son, Christopher (1947). The beginning of the United States's involvement in World War II interrupted Deibenkorn's education at Stanford, and he was not able complete his degree at that time. Diebenkorn entered the United States Marine Corps in 1943, where he served until 1945.

While enlisted, Diebenkorn continued to study art and expanded his knowledge of European modernism, first while enrolled briefly at the University of California, Berkeley, and later on the East Coast, while stationed at the Marine base in Quantico, Virginia. While enrolled at Berkeley he had three influential teachers: Worth Ryder,  Erle Loran, and Eugene Neuhaus. Both Ryder and Erle Loran had studied art in Europe in the 1920s and brought their first-hand knowledge of European modernism to their teaching. Neuhaus emigrated from Germany in 1904 and was a seminal figure in establishing the Bay Area as a center of art appreciation and education on the West Coast. On the East Coast, when he transferred to the base in Quantico, Diebenkorn took advantage of his location to visit art museums in Washington, DC, Philadelphia, and New York City. This allowed him to study in person the paintings of modern masters such as Pierre Bonnard, Georges Braque, Henri Matisse, Joan Miró, and Pablo Picasso. Also at this time, he had his first exposure to the new New York–based artists who were beginning their abstract Surrealism-based paintings. The work of Robert Motherwell, in particular, left an impression. Diebenkorn began his own experiments in abstract painting.

In 1945, Diebenkorn was scheduled to deploy to Japan; however, with the end of the war in August 1945, he was discharged, and he returned to life in the Bay Area.

During the late 1940s and early 1950s, Diebenkorn lived and worked in various places: San Francisco and Sausalito (1946–47 and 1947–1950), Woodstock, New York (1947), Albuquerque, New Mexico (1950–1952), Urbana, Illinois (1952–53), and Berkeley, California (1953–1966). He developed his own style of abstract expressionist painting. After World War II, the focus of the art world shifted from the School of Paris to the United States and, in particular, to the New York School. In 1946, Diebenkorn enrolled as a student in the California School of Fine Arts (CSFA) in San Francisco (now known as the San Francisco Art Institute), which was developing its own vigorous style of abstract expressionism. In 1947, after ten months in Woodstock on an Alfred Bender travel grant, Diebenkorn returned to the CSFA, where he adopted abstract expressionism as his vehicle for self-expression. He was offered a place on the CSFA faculty in 1947 and taught there until 1950. He was influenced at first by Clyfford Still, who also taught at the CSFA from 1946 to 1950, Arshile Gorky, Hassel Smith, and Willem de Kooning. Diebenkorn became a leading abstract expressionist on the West Coast. From 1950 to 1952, Diebenkorn was enrolled under the G.I. Bill in the University of New Mexico’s graduate fine arts department, where he continued to adapt his abstract expressionist style.

For the academic year 1952–53, Richard Diebenkorn took a faculty position at the University of Illinois in Urbana, where he taught painting and drawing. In November and December 1952, he had his first solo exhibit at a commercial art gallery, the Paul Kantor Gallery in Los Angeles.

In September 1953, Diebenkorn moved to back to the San Francisco Bay Area from New York City, where he had spent the summer. He took a position at California College of Arts and Crafts in 1955 where he taught until 1958.  He established his home in Berkeley and lived there until 1966. It was during the first few years of this period that Diebenkorn abandoned his strict adherence to abstract expressionism and began to work in a more representational style. By the mid-1950s, Diebenkorn had become an important figurative painter, in a style that bridged Henri Matisse and abstract expressionism. Diebenkorn, Elmer Bischoff, Henry Villierme, David Park, James Weeks, and others participated in a renaissance of figurative painting, dubbed the Bay Area Figurative Movement. His subject matter during this period included interiors, landscapes, and still lifes, as well as the human figure.

Diebenkorn began to have a measure of success with his artwork during this period. He was included in several group shows and had several solo exhibits. In 1960, a mid-career retrospective was presented by the Pasadena Art Museum (now the Norton Simon Museum). That autumn, a variation of the show moved to the California Palace of the Legion of Honor in San Francisco.
In summer 1961, while a visiting instructor at UCLA, Diebenkorn first became acquainted with printmaking when his graduate assistant introduced him to the printmaking technique of drypoint. Also while in Southern California, Diebenkorn was a guest at Tamarind Lithography Workshop (now the Tamarind Institute), where he worked on a suite of prints that was completed in 1962.

Upon his return to Berkeley in fall 1961, Diebenkorn began seriously exploring drypoint and printmaking with Kathan Brown at her newly established fine arts printing press, Crown Point Press. In 1965, Crown Point Press printed and published an edition of thirteen bound volumes and twelve unbound folios of Diebenkorn's first suite of prints, 41 Etchings Drypoints. This project was the first publication of Crown Point's catalogue). Diebenkorn would not do any more etching again until 1977, when Brown renewed their artistic relationship. From then until 1992, Diebenkorn returned almost yearly to Crown Point Press to produce work.

Also in the fall of 1961, Diebenkorn became a faculty member at the San Francisco Art Institute, where he taught periodically until 1966. He also taught intermittently during these years at a number of other colleges, including the California College of Arts and Crafts and Mills College in Oakland, the University of Southern California (USC), the University of Colorado, Boulder, and the University of California, Los Angeles (UCLA).

In September 1963, Diebenkorn was named the first artist-in-residence at Stanford University in Palo Alto, California, an appointment that lasted until June 1964. His only responsibility in this position was to produce art in a studio provided by the university. Students were allowed to visit him in the studio during scheduled times. Though he created a few paintings during his time at Stanford, he did produce a large number of drawings. Stanford presented an extensive show of these drawings at the end of his residency.

From fall 1964 to spring 1965, Diebenkorn traveled through Europe, and he was granted a cultural visa to visit important Soviet museums and view their holdings of Matisse's paintings. When he returned to painting in the Bay Area in mid-1965, his resulting works summed up all that he had learned from more than a decade as a leading figurative painter.

The Henri Matisse paintings French Window at Collioure, and View of Notre-Dame, both from 1914, exerted tremendous influence on Richard Diebenkorn's Ocean Park paintings.
According to art historian Jane Livingston, Diebenkorn saw both Matisse paintings in an exhibition in Los Angeles in 1966, and they had an enormous effect on him and his work. Livingston said about the January 1966 Matisse exhibition that Diebenkorn saw in Los Angeles,
It is difficult not to ascribe enormous weight to this experience for the direction his work took from that time on. Two pictures he saw there reverberate in almost every Ocean Park canvas. View of Notre Dame and French Window at Collioure, both painted in 1914, were on view for the first time in the US.
Livingston went on to say, "Diebenkorn must have experienced French Window at Collioure as an epiphany."

In September 1966, Diebenkorn moved to Santa Monica, California, and took up a professorship at UCLA. He moved into a small studio space in the same building as his old friend from the Bay Area, Sam Francis. In winter 1966–67, he returned to abstraction, this time in a distinctly personal, geometric style that clearly departed from his early abstract expressionist period. The Ocean Park series, begun in 1967 and developed for the next 18 years, became his most famous work and resulted in approximately 135 paintings. Based on the aerial landscape and perhaps the view from the window of his studio, these large-scale abstract compositions were named after a community in Santa Monica, where he had his studio. Diebenkorn retired from UCLA in 1973. The Ocean Park series bridged his earlier abstract expressionist works with color field painting and lyrical abstraction.

In 1986, Diebenkorn decided to leave Santa Monica and Southern California. After traveling and looking around several different areas in the western United States, in 1988, Diebenkorn and his wife settled in Healdsburg, California, where he built a new studio. In 1989 he began suffering serious health issues related to heart disease. Though still producing prints, drawings, and smaller paintings, his poor health prevented him from completing larger paintings. In 1990, Diebenkorn produced a series of six etchings for the Arion Press edition of Poems of W. B. Yeats, with poems selected and introduced by Helen Vendler.

Diebenkorn died due to complications from emphysema in Berkeley on March 30, 1993.

Exhibitions
Diebenkorn had his first show at the California Palace of the Legion of Honor in San Francisco 1948. The first important retrospective of his work took place at the Albright–Knox Art Gallery in Buffalo, New York, in 1976–77; the  show, then traveled to Washington, DC, Cincinnati, Los Angeles, and Oakland. In 1989, John Elderfield, then a curator at the Museum of Modern Art in New York, organized a show of Diebenkorn's works on paper, which constituted an important part of his production.

In 2012, an exhibition, Richard Diebenkorn: The Ocean Park Series, curated by Sarah C. Bancroft, traveled to the Modern Art Museum of Fort Worth, the Orange County Museum of Art, and the Corcoran Gallery of Art in Washington, DC.

Major recent shows in the San Francisco Bay Area have included Diebenkorn: The Berkeley Years, July–September 2013, at the De Young Museum, San Francisco; an exhibition of small works, June 6–August 23, 2015, at the Sonoma Valley Museum of Art, Sonoma; and Matisse/Diebenkorn, a major show highlighting Matisses's influence on Richard Diebenkorn, March 11–May 29, 2017, at the San Francisco Museum of Modern Art.

Collections
Diebenkorn's work can be found in a number of public collections including the New Mexico Museum of Art, Santa Fe, New Mexico; Honolulu Museum of Art, Honolulu, Hawaii; Albertina, Vienna, Austria; Albright–Knox Art Gallery, Buffalo, New York; Art Institute of Chicago, Chicago; Baltimore Museum of Art; Carnegie Institute, Pittsburgh; Corcoran Gallery of Art, Washington, D.C.; the de Young Museum, San Francisco; Kalamazoo Institute of Arts, Michigan, Hirshhorn Museum and Sculpture Garden, Washington, D.C.; Los Angeles County Museum of Art; Minneapolis Institute of Art; Museum of Fine Arts, Houston, Texas; Phillips Collection, Washington, D.C.; San Francisco Museum of Modern Art, San Francisco; Solomon R. Guggenheim Museum, New York; and the Whitney Museum of American Art, New York.  The Iris & B. Gerald Cantor Center for Visual Arts at Stanford University is home to 29 of Diebenkorn's sketchbooks as well as a collection of paintings and other works on paper.

Recognition
In 1978, Diebenkorn was awarded The Edward MacDowell Medal by The MacDowell Colony for outstanding contributions to American culture 

In 1991, Diebenkorn was awarded the National Medal of Arts. In 1979, he was elected into the National Academy of Design as an Associate member, and became a full Academician in 1982.

Art market
In 2018, Diebenkorn's Ocean Park #126 painted in 1984 became the most expensive picture by the artist auctioned when it went for $23.9 million at Christie's New York. The previous record from 2012, also at Christie's, was Ocean Park #48 painted in 1971 for $13.5 million. At a 2014 Sotheby's sale of Rachel Lambert Mellon's private collection, Italian fashion designer Valentino Garavani bought Ocean Park #89 (1975), an abstract image of a sunset, for $9.68 million.

Author William Benton made a painting in the style of Diebenkorn's Ocean Park for a friend who was a big admirer of the artist's work. At the back of the painting, Benton wrote a message signed with Diebenkorn's name. When the friend died in 1995, his estate was evaluated and an appraiser, not knowing the paintings provenance, marked the work as worth $50–60,000.

References

Sources
 Jane Livingston, The Art of Richard Diebenkorn, with essays by John Elderfield, Ruth E. Fine, and Jane Livingston. The Whitney Museum of American Art, 1997, 
 Marika Herskovic, American Abstract Expressionism of the 1950s An Illustrated Survey, (New York School Press, 2003.) . p. 102–105
Marika Herskovic, American Abstract and Figurative Expressionism: Style Is Timely Art Is Timeless. (New York School Press, 2009.) . p. 80–83
 Bancroft, Sarah, Richard Diebenkorn: The Ocean Park Series. Newport Beach: Orange County Museum of Art, 2012,

Further reading
 Nancy Marmer, "Richard Diebenkorn: Pacific Extensions," Art in America, January/February 1978, pp. 95–99.
 Gerald Nordland (1987).  Richard Diebenkorn. New York: Rizzoli. .

External links
 Richard Diebenkorn Foundation

 Richard Diebenkorn Artwork Examples on AskART.

American abstract artists
Abstract painters
Abstract expressionist artists
American Expressionist painters
American Figurative Expressionism
1922 births
1993 deaths
American contemporary painters
Painters from California
Artists from Berkeley, California
Artists from Los Angeles
Artists from Portland, Oregon
Artists from the San Francisco Bay Area
National Academy of Design members
San Francisco Art Institute alumni
Stanford University alumni
United States Marines
University of New Mexico alumni
20th-century American painters
American male painters
20th-century American printmakers
Honorary Members of the Royal Academy
20th-century American male artists
Members of the American Academy of Arts and Letters